Spongiosperma  is a genus of plant in family Apocynaceae first described as a genus in 1988. It is native to the South America, nations of Venezuela, Colombia, and Brazil.

Species
 Spongiosperma cataractarum Zarucchi - Bolívar State in SE Venezuela
 Spongiosperma grandiflorum (Huber) Zarucchi - Amapá, Pará, Maranhão
 Spongiosperma longilobum (Markgr.) Zarucchi - Amazonas State in NW Brazil
 Spongiosperma macrophyllum (Müll.Arg.) Zarucchi - S Venezuela, SE Colombia, NW Brazil
 Spongiosperma oleifolium (Monach.) Zarucchi - Amazonas State in S Venezuela
 Spongiosperma riparium (Monach.) Zarucchi - S Venezuela, SE Colombia

References

 
Apocynaceae genera